New York Central Railroad Adirondack Division Historic District is a national historic district located in Essex, Franklin, Hamilton, Herkimer, Oneida, and St. Lawrence County, New York.  The district includes 23 contributing buildings and 18 contributing structures.  It encompasses the former Mohawk and Malone Railway that eventually became the Adirondack Division of the New York Central Railroad in 1913.

It was listed on the National Register of Historic Places in 1993.

References

Essex County, New York
Historic districts on the National Register of Historic Places in New York (state)
Historic districts in St. Lawrence County, New York
Historic districts in Oneida County, New York
Historic districts in Herkimer County, New York
Buildings and structures in Hamilton County, New York
Historic districts in Franklin County, New York
National Register of Historic Places in Essex County, New York
National Register of Historic Places in Franklin County, New York
National Register of Historic Places in Hamilton County, New York
National Register of Historic Places in Herkimer County, New York
National Register of Historic Places in Oneida County, New York
National Register of Historic Places in St. Lawrence County, New York